Drake Stadium is a stadium on the campus of Drake University in Des Moines, Iowa, United States. Best known as the home of the Drake Relays, it also serves as the home field of the university's football team. It opened in 1925.

History
Drake Stadium opened on October 10, 1925, as the Bulldogs defeated Kansas.

Drake Stadium has seen the Bulldogs win thirteen conference championships in football, while advancing to five college football bowl games.  The stadium is also the home field for nearby Des Moines Roosevelt High School and occasional home games for Dowling High School. It is currently the largest stadium in the Pioneer Football League.

Drake Stadium is also the home to the Drake Relays, one of the premier track and field meets in the country. Thousands of high school, college, and professional track athletes come to Drake Stadium in late April to compete in one of the largest track meets in the United States. The prominence of the Relays has led to Drake hosting various other national and regional professional, collegiate, and youth meets. Fourteen world records have been set at the Relays.

The stadium also hosts the Iowa boys and girls high school track state championships.

It also serves as a secondary venue for the university's men's and women's soccer teams. In 2019, the Des Moines Menace, a local USL League Two soccer club, played its home schedule at the stadium.

Renovations
The football field at Drake Stadium is named in honor of Drake alumnus and football great Johnny Bright. The track is named after famed announcer Jim Duncan.

The installation of a $175,000 tartan track in 1969 replaced the cinder track. It was a magnificent 60th birthday present for Drake Relays competitors and fans. In 1976, all individual events at the Drake Relays went metric; in 1978, the conversion was completed with rebuilding of the track into a 400-meter oval so that relay races, too, could go metric. The Jim Duncan Track was resurfaced in the summer of 1989 in Drake blue school colors, featuring a combination of polyurethane coating and EPDM rubber granules. Since this installation, track and field athletes and fans frequently refer to the venue as the "Blue Oval".

The 2005–2006 renovation project improved many aspects of the stadium.  The surface area of the stadium was flattened (previously the infield sat several feet lower than the track surface).  It created a reconfigured track to meet NCAA and international standards, improved seating, and added a "safety lane" on the outside of the track for athletes (in the old configuration, fans could easily make contact with a competitor in lane 8). In addition, a new scoreboard with video screen was placed at the northeast corner of the stadium. Widening the track reduced the stadium's seating capacity from 18,000 to 14,557. As a result, throwing events were moved to an area north of the stadium.

The Bulldogs played their 2005 home games at Waukee High School's Warrior Stadium due to renovations at the stadium.

In the summer of 2016, the field and track were resurfaced. New turf was installed and the track surface was replaced using the same material used at the Beijing and London Summer Olympics.

Notable events
Drake Stadium has hosted the NCAA Division I Outdoor Track and Field Championships on four occasions:
 1970 (men's only)
 2008 (men's and women's)
 2011 (men's and women's)
 2012 (men's and women's)

The 2008 championships doubled the previous four-day record crowd with a total attendance of 41,187 (including over 11,000 for the final day) despite heavy flooding in Des Moines.

Drake Stadium has also hosted the USA Outdoor Track and Field Championships four times:
 2010
 2013
 2018
 2019

Additionally, the facility has hosted the AAU Junior Olympic Games four times.

Stadium records

Men

Women

See also
 List of NCAA Division I FCS football stadiums

References

External links
Drake Stadium - Drake Bulldogs

College football venues
Drake Bulldogs football
Buildings and structures in Des Moines, Iowa
Tourist attractions in Des Moines, Iowa
Sports in Des Moines, Iowa
Sports venues in Greater Des Moines
American football venues in Iowa
Athletics (track and field) venues in Iowa
College track and field venues in the United States
1925 establishments in Iowa
Sports venues completed in 1925
High school football venues in the United States
Soccer venues in Iowa
College soccer venues in the United States